William Wemple may refer to:
 William W. Wemple (1862–1933), American lawyer and politician from New York
 William W. Wemple, Jr. (1898–1972), American lawyer and politician
 William Wemple (lawyer, born 1912) (1912–2002), American lawyer from New York